The women's competition in the +75 kg division was held on 25–26 October 2013 in Centennial Hall, Wrocław, Poland.

Schedule

Medalists

Records

Results

New records

References

Results 
Results

2013 World Weightlifting Championships
World